The Women's marathon T52-53 was a marathon event in athletics at the 1996 Summer Paralympics, for wheelchair athletes. It was the only women's marathon at this games. The host country, the USA won gold courtesy of Jean Driscoll. Of the eighteen starters, thirteen reached the finish line.

Results

See also
 Marathon at the Paralympics

References 

Women's marathon T52-53
1996 marathons
Marathons at the Paralympics
1996 Summer Olympics
Summer Paralympics marathon T52-53
Marathons in the United States